Mista'arvim, also spelled mista'aravim, is the name given to counter-terrorism units of the Israel Defense Forces, Israel Border Police, and Israel Police who operate undercover. Such units are specifically trained to assimilate among the local Arab population. They are commonly tasked with performing intelligence gathering, law enforcement, hostage rescue and counter-terrorism, and to use disguise and surprise as their main weapons.

The name is derived from the Arabic "Musta'arabi", meaning "those who live among the Arabs", which refers to the Musta'arabi Jews, Arabic-speaking Jews who lived in the Middle East since the beginning of the Arab rule in the 7th century, prior to the arrival of Ladino-speaking Sephardic Jews following their expulsion from Spain in 1492.

Etymology
The Hebrew mista'arvim derives from the Arabic  mustaʿribīn, literally "those who live among the Arabs," or simply "Arabized." Israeli Musta'ribeen are special forces who pose undercover as Arabs and operate within Arab societies to accomplish their missions. Musta'ribeen dress as Arabs, know the customs and etiquette of Arab society and speak fluent Arabic, in the appropriate dialect. Musta'ribeen have participated in public demonstrations and may support the protests as if they were demonstrators.

Gary Spedding, a consultant on the Middle East, said that the activity of Musta'ribeen "allows the Israeli military and border police to identify protesters they wish to arrest and detain. Israeli affairs expert Antoine Shalhat claimed that the main missions of the Musta'ribeen "include gathering intelligence and counterterrorist operations."

Pre-statehood
A Mista'arvim unit, with the code-name ha-Shahar (The Dawn) was established secretly by the Palmach in 1943 and consisted mainly of native Arabic-speaking Sephardi Jews, virtually indistinguishable from Arabs generally. With the outbreak of the 1948 Palestinian War in November 1947, members of ha-Shahar were deployed as intelligence agents capable of penetrating Arab urban neighbourhoods and villages and, at times, in sabotage and assassinations. In 1948, the commander of this Arab platoon  Moshe Ben-Zvi expressed interest in assisting Israeli operations of biological warfare. It appears that subsequently, on 21 May, two mista'arvim, David Mizrahi and Ezra Horin,  operating out of Dorot and kibbutz Gevarʿam (?) were captured by Egyptian troops as they attempted to poison with typhoid and diphtheria bacteria the wells from which Egyptian troops in Gaza drew their water supplies, in clear violation of the 1925 Geneva Protocol, an incident which lead Egypt to make a formal protest to the Secretary General of the United Nations later that month.
In his book, Spies of No Country, Matti Friedman tells the history of a pre-statehood unit operating in Syria.

Training
Training for these units consumes about fifteen months:
 Four months basic infantry training at the Mitkan Adam army base – the IDF Special Training Center – near - Modi'in-Maccabim-Re'ut.
 Two and a half months of advanced infantry training in the same base.
 Two months of the unit's basic training, which focus on advanced urban navigation and the beginning of counter-terrorism training.
 Four months Mista'arvim course, which covers everything from learning Arab traditions, language, and way of thought, to civilian camouflage (hair dyeing, contact lenses, clothing).
 One-month courses – sniper, driving and different instructor courses.

Known units
The first musta'ribeen unit, known as the "Arab Department" (Ha-Machlaka Ha-Aravit), was established in 1942 as a unit of the Palmach. Other musta'ribeen groups in Israel have included:

 Sayeret Shaked, a unit of the IDF, which operated undercover in the Gaza Strip in the 1970s
 Sayeret Shimshon (Unit 367), which operated in the Gaza Strip until its disbandment in 1994 after the Oslo Accords
 Rimon, operating from 1987 until 2005 in Gaza
 Sayeret Duvdevan (Unit 217), established in the West Bank in the 1980s and still operating
 Yamas, a unit of the Israel Border Police
 Gideonim (Unit 33), an undercover and mista'arvim unit of the Israeli Police, still operating as of 2012
 Hermesh, operating in the Judea and Samaria Area of the West Bank until 1994, when it was transferred to the Kfir Brigade

See also
Israeli special forces units
Fauda
Eli Cohen, Egyptian-born Israeli spy known for his work in Egypt and Syria
Zvi Yehezkeli, Israeli journalist who lived under Arab aliases in Europe and the U.S. in 2016-17 to investigate the Muslim Brotherhood and its influence; he posed as a sheikh. In the 1990s he had lived in the Palestinian cities of Hebron and Jenin with the stated aim of perfecting his knowledge of the Arabic language and culture.

References

External links 
 Deflem, Mathieu. 2012. "Yehida Mishtartit Mistaravim (YAMAS) (Israel)." pp. 71–72 in Counterterrorism: From the Cold War to the War on Terror, Vol. 2, edited by Frank G. Shanty. Santa Barbara, CA: Praeger/ABC-CLIO
 Other activity by the Mista'arvim: "mistaravim | The Electronic Intifada"
 Who is Musta'ribeen

Counterterrorism in Israel
Special forces of Israel
Arab–Israeli conflict